The Secretary for Justice was a bureau secretary and senior law officer in Portuguese Macau. The Secretary headed the Secretariat for Justice, which was responsible for legal affairs and public prosecution in the colony. The department was replaced by the Secretariat for Administration and Justice in December 1999.

List of responsibilities:
 Legal Affairs Bureau
 Printing Bureau
 International Law Office
 Gabinete para a Reforma Judica

List of Secretariats
 Dr. Jorge Alberto Hagedorn Rangel - Secretary until 1999; now President of the Macau International Institute
 Ho Ven On - Assistant Secretary
 Jorge Noronha e Silveira - under secretary

Attorney general
The former role of the Attorney General was that of the highest law officer of Macau.
 Antonio Simoes Redinha - last Attorney General of Macau

References
 Casa de Macau - references to former Portuguese secretaries

Government departments and agencies of Macau
Members of the Executive Council of Macau
Macau
Political office-holders in Macau
Positions of the Macau Government
1999 disestablishments in Macau